Gherardi is a surname of Northern Italian origin.  It is most common in the regions of Emilia-Romagna, Lombardy and Tuscany.  The name comes from the Germanic words gari > ger- (meaning 'spear') and -hard (meaning 'hard/strong/brave').  The first family recorded to have this name in 970 AD, were the Gherardinghi family who owned five castles in Tuscany.  The name has since been shortened and many variations of the name can be found throughout Italy.  According to Italy Gen, about 1800 people with the last name of Gherardi still reside in Northern Italy.  Worldwide there are about 2500 people with this last name. 

Some examples of known people with the last name:

 Alessandro Gherardi (born 1988), Italian footballer
 Anna Maria Gherardi (1939–2014), Italian actress and voice actress
 Antonio Gherardi (1638–1702), Italian painter, architect and sculptor
 Bancroft Gherardi (1832–1903), U.S. Navy rear admiral
 Bancroft Gherardi, Jr. (1873–1941), American electrical engineer
 Cristofano Gherardi (1508–1556), Italian painter
 Évariste Gherardi (1663-1700),  Italian actor and playwright 
 Filippo Gherardi (1643–1704), Italian painter
 Francesca Gherardi (1955-2013), Italian zoologist, ethologist, and ecologist
 Giuseppe Gherardi (1750-1828), Italian painter, active in the Neoclassic style
 Lorenzo Gherardi (1645-1727),  Roman Catholic prelate who served as Bishop of Recanati e Loreto
 Maffeo Gherardi (1406–1492), Cardinal of Venice
 Marcella Gherardi Michelangeli (born 1943), Italian former actress and singer
 Piero Gherardi (1909–1971), Italian film costume and set designer
 Gherardi Davis (1858–1941), New York politician

See also
 USS Gherardi (DD-637), a Gleaves-class destroyer
 Palazzo Gherardi, 15th-century building in the centre of Florence, Italy
 Gherardini
 Ghirardi

Germanic-language surnames
Surnames of Italian origin